The Musée d'Histoire Naturelle de Lille, or Lille Natural History Museum, was founded in 1822. It houses zoological and geological collections. Its holdings have recently been enhanced by ethnographic specimens from the Musée Moillet and industrial objects from the old Musée Industriel et Commercial de Lille. The museum's address is 19 Rue de Bruxelles.

External links

  Musée d'Histoire Naturelle de Lille
 Musée d'Histoire Naturelle et d'Ethnographie

Tourist attractions in Lille
Natural history museums in France
Buildings and structures in Lille
Museums in Nord (French department)